Camille Darsières (born 19 May 1932 in Fort-de-France, Martinique; died 14 December 2006) was a socialist politician from Martinique who served as the Deputy for Martinique's 3rd constituency in the French National Assembly from 1993 to 2002.
He was a member of the Martinican Progressive Party and succeeded the founder of that party, Aimé Césaire in the constituency.

References 
Camille Darsières page on the French National Assembly website

1932 births
2006 deaths
People from Fort-de-France
Martinican Progressive Party politicians
Deputies of the 10th National Assembly of the French Fifth Republic
Deputies of the 11th National Assembly of the French Fifth Republic
Presidents of the Regional Council of Martinique
Black French politicians